Angela Farrell (born 1952 in Donegal) is an Irish singer who performed on Eurovision in 1971 with the song "One Day Love". With 79 points, she came in 11th position.

Singles 
 One day love (1971) — #4 Irish Singles Chart
 How Near Is Love (1971) — #4 Irish Singles Chart
 I Am (1971) — #9 Irish Singles Chart
 Somewhere In The Shadow of My Dreams (1971) — #9 Irish Singles Chart
 Top of the World (1972)
 Dusty (1972)

References 

1952 births
Living people
Eurovision Song Contest entrants of 1971
Eurovision Song Contest entrants for Ireland
Irish women singers